Čečava (Serbian Cyrillic: Чечава) is a village in the municipality of Teslić, Bosnia and Herzegovina.

Ethnic composition, 1991 census

total: 2,616
 Serbs - 2,503 (95.68%)
 Yugoslavs - 54 (2.06%)
 Croats - 36 (1.37%)
 others and unknown - 22 (0.84%)

History
Čečava makes its first appearance in 1323 in records and documents of a decree by prince Stjepan and his brother Vladislav Kotromanić, in which supervisor Grgur Stipanović is rewarded for his obedience with the annexation of five villages, in the territory of Usora, to his kingdom. It is written: "Firstly Chechava, secondly Hrastusa, thirdly Unenovichi Uskrsh,..."

Because of his loyalty Grgur seems to have been the delegate representative of the Bosnian court, to escort Prince Stjepan's matchmakings from the Hungarian King. There's also a myth that may be relative to this historical source. In the settlement of Plane east of the Grualj hill (643m/1,780 feet), a smaller hill lies, which is called "The hill of  the Queen" (Kraljichino Brdo). At its northwestern side the hill is surrounded by woods and so it seems obvious that its top had been cleaned of the woods for some purpose. There also exists a crossroads of old paths leading to all far directions used by caravans; the way to Stupa and Osredak(Stupljanski put), the way through Miladić Brdo to Čečava, the Pope's Road (Popovski Put) to Kulaši and the way over the Grualj hill to Gornji Vijačani and Snjegotina.

According to tradition, villagers and official quests greeted the Queen on that hill many years ago, as she entered their land to marry the Bosnian King.

Nevertheless, the reason why the village was named Čečava in about the 14th century still remains unknown. The historical period between the beginning of the 14th century until the beginning of the 19th century still remains unknown. There are no existing documents concerning the civilization of Čečava during this period. This is due to the great immigration of Serbs because of the violent invasion of the Turks. It is believed that the residents of the village moved norther. Some documents refer that they have been transferred to the area which is now called Slavonija.

The monks of the monasteries in Liplje and Stuplje were also  installed in 1691 in the monastery Orahovica which belong to the Slavonska Pozega area. According to the tradition these monks reached Čečava through the mountains of  Komusanska Brda  where they met other monks from the monastery of Liplje who had crossed  up the Snjegotina, and they all continued their way to the North. Their long journey ended to the river Sava by crossing first the river Ukrina where they have met the Chechava's residents. The residents followed them and where installed  to Slavonija. There are still villages in the area called "Čečavac" and "Čečavski vučinjak" which confirms this hypothesis of immigration. Bat there was a part of the Čečava's residents who didn't cross Sava river. This is confirmed by the fact that in the city of Brod we still find people who their surname is "Chechavac". It is still in dispute whether some of them returned during the 18th century or other emigrants were installed in Čečava. But the truth is that there were no reason to return judging by the difficult circumstances.

Čečava is situated in the Northeast part of Teslich, located on the summit of the Javorova mountain and spans across the valley of the M. Ukrina river. Mr Milenko Filipovic writes:
Up there on the mountain sides and valleys and the elbow that materialites by the Ukrina river are located residences of the Čečava village, one of the few Bosnian villages the existence of which was printed on the legal documents of the Middle Ages.

The village spans across . It is a neighbour to the villages Prnjavor, Gornji Vijačani, Kulaši. North west, the villages of the municipality of  Teslić, Rastuša, Ukrinica, Osivica and Rankovich, Pribinić to the south, as well as Snjegotina Gornja to the west. The village begins at the (Junction of the river Osivica with the river M. Ukrina, then directed southwest towards the summit of the Nedić Brdo hill up to the Tisovac hill, continuing through the Aliji Brezina Kosa mountainside, ending up at the Miljkovac. The village continues northwest towards the shall hills of Rovovi, Mala Hrastovača and thus the borders finish at the Lipova Glava. From there the borders turn north to the hill of Bogdanica and through the most forest area of Krestelovac they emerge at the Šabanova Glavica hill. The borders continue Northwest at the Vuchicke Bare and over the hill of Puskarnica reaches the Grualj hill. From the Grualj the borderline is directed from the Kraljicino Brdo to the Stupa read, and continue to the vines (Veliki Vinogradi) and Prokop, then from the small hills of Velika and Mala Balabanovića and reaches the trigonometric spot 249. The village continues southeast reaching up to the M. Ukrina river and through the river  borders end up at the point where they started from, meaning the 12th km (dvanaesti kilometer). The administrative center of the village lies at the point were M. Ukrina river meets the smaller river Chechavica.

There are several local legends about the "Queen's Hill" (Kraljicino Brdo) that there was a cottage where she would stay occasionally.

There are also legends about some marks on the hill tops like "Glavica" that represented something to the Austrian Empire at that time. There are several "Glavica" hills there actually. Local say that marks were either the bottle with a letter inside or rock pillars.

Also interesting is the Rastuša Cave, which may hold many clues about that region.

There are a few rocky, grave look like pillars with some strange writing that nobody exactly knows what they are and what they say. One is in "Brdjani" and the other is in "Prodanović" graveyard. One in "Prodanović" graveyard is the part of circular rocky formation that looks like either building foundation or altar.

See also
 Usora (region)

References
 Ethnic composition of Bosnia-Herzegovina population, by municipalities and settlements, 1991. census, Zavod za statistiku Bosne i Hercegovine - Bilten no.234, Sarajevo 1991.

External links

 Portal www.cecava.org Cecava Portal
 Disco Boki

Villages in Republika Srpska
Teslić